Žbandaj is a village in Croatia.

References

Populated places in Istria County